Mauro Damián Rosales (born 24 February 1981) is an Argentine former footballer who last played in Alumni. A winger/forward best known for his pace and crossing ability, he won a gold medal with Argentina at the 2004 Summer Olympics.

Club career 

Rosales began his career with Newell's Old Boys. His play with Newell's attracted the interest of top European clubs and in 2004 he joined Dutch top side Ajax. While with Ajax Rosales appeared in 63 league matches scoring 6 goals. In 2007 Rosales left Ajax returning to Argentina to play for River Plate for a fee of 1.8 million euros. He was part of the squad that won the Clausura 2008 tournament, the club's first title in four years.

In January 2011 it was reported that he would be joining Querétaro F.C. of Mexico's Primera División. However, he was not signed by the Mexican club. In late February 2011 he went on trial with Seattle Sounders FC of Major League Soccer in the United States. On 18 March 2011, following a successful trial, the club officially signed Rosales. During Rosales' first season with Seattle, he scored 5 goals in 26 appearances. Additionally, he assisted on 13 goals which was third overall in the league. His 13 assists also set a club record for number of assists by a single player in a single season. Rosales won the MLS Newcomer of the Year Award for the 2011 Major League Soccer season and was subsequently signed to a new, multi-year deal on 13 December 2011. In his three years with the club Rosales tallied 12 goals and 34 assists in league play. He also helped the club in capturing the 2011 Lamar Hunt U.S. Open Cup.

Rosales was traded to Chivas USA in exchange for Tristan Bowen on 11 December 2013.

Rosales was traded to Vancouver Whitecaps FC in exchange for Nigel Reo-Coker on 21 August 2014. At the end of the 2014 season, Rosales opted out of the MLS re-entry draft for the next season later signing with the club for an additional year The following year the Whitecaps did not offer a contract to Rosales and he was made eligible for the MLS reentry draft. He started in 29 of the 35 games he played for the club scoring one goal and assisting in six other in 2321 minutes of regular season play and an additional 91 minutes in two games in the post-season.

On 16 February 2016, Rosales was traded to FC Dallas in exchange for Blas Pérez.

International career 

Rosales was part of the Argentina Under-20 team that won the 2001 FIFA World Youth Championship and the gold-medal winning Argentina national team at the 2004 Summer Olympics. Also in 2004, he was part of the Argentina squad that finished runners-up in that year's Copa America.

Personal life 

Rosales earned his U.S. green card in March 2012. This status qualifies him as a domestic player for MLS roster purposes.

Career statistics

International

Honours

Club 

Ajax

 KNVB Cup: 2005–06, 2006–07
 Johan Cruijff Shield: 2005, 2006

River Plate

 Primera División: Clausura 2008

Seattle Sounders FC

 Lamar Hunt U.S. Open Cup: 2011

Vancouver Whitecaps FC

 Canadian Championship: 2015

FC Dallas

 Lamar Hunt U.S. Open Cup: 2016
 Supporters' Shield: 2016

International 

Argentina U-20

 FIFA U-20 World Cup: 2001

Argentina U-23

 Summer Olympic Games: 2004

Individual 

 MLS Newcomer of the Year: 2011

References

External links 

 
 
 
 Mauro Rosales – Argentine Primera statistics at Fútbol XXI 
 River Plate player profile 

1981 births
Living people
Argentine people of Spanish descent
Argentine footballers
Newell's Old Boys footballers
AFC Ajax players
Club Atlético River Plate footballers
Seattle Sounders FC players
Chivas USA players
Vancouver Whitecaps FC players
FC Dallas players
Eredivisie players
Major League Soccer players
Argentina youth international footballers
Argentina under-20 international footballers
Argentina international footballers
Footballers at the 2004 Summer Olympics
2004 Copa América players
Olympic footballers of Argentina
Olympic gold medalists for Argentina
Argentine expatriate footballers
Expatriate footballers in the Netherlands
Expatriate soccer players in the United States
Expatriate soccer players in Canada
Argentine expatriate sportspeople in the Netherlands
People from Villa María
Argentine Primera División players
Olympic medalists in football
Designated Players (MLS)
Medalists at the 2004 Summer Olympics
Association football midfielders
Sportspeople from Córdoba Province, Argentina